Philippine Agenda is a 2007 Philippine television public affairs show broadcast by GMA Network. The show focuses on the 2007 Philippine general election. Hosted by Jessica Soho, Mel Tiangco, Vicky Morales, Mike Enriquez and Arnold Clavio, it premiered on March 25, 2007. The show concluded on May 13, 2007 with a total of 8 episodes.

Episodes

References

External links
 

2007 Philippine television series debuts
2007 Philippine television series endings
Filipino-language television shows
GMA Network original programming
GMA Integrated News and Public Affairs shows
Philippine television shows